The 2002 FIU Panthers football team represented Florida International University in the 2002 NCAA Division I-AA football season as an NCAA Division I-AA independent school. The Panthers were led by head coach Don Strock in his first season and finished with a record of five wins and six losses (5–6).

FIU played its first-ever game August 29, 2002 against St. Peter's (N.J.) at old FIU Stadium. The Panthers won 27-3 that night and a football program was born.

Schedule

References

FIU
FIU Panthers football seasons
FIU Golden Panthers football